Orders Is Orders is a 1933 British comedy film starring Charlotte Greenwood, James Gleason and Cyril Maude about an American film crew who move into a British army barracks to start making a film, much to the commander's horror. Much of the film concerns the interaction between the American crew and the British officers. It is based upon the 1932 play Orders Are Orders by Ian Hay and Anthony Armstrong. It was shot at the Lime Grove Studios in London with sets designed by the art director Alfred Junge.

It was remade in 1954 as Orders Are Orders starring Peter Sellers, Sid James and Tony Hancock.

Cast
Charlotte Greenwood as Wanda Sinclair 
 James Gleason as Ed Waggermeyer 
 Cyril Maude as Col. Bellamy 
 Finlay Currie as Dave 
 Percy Parsons as Zingbaum 
 Cedric Hardwicke as Brigadier 
 Donald Calthrop as Pavey 
 Ian Hunter as Capt. Harper 
 Jane Carr as Patricia Bellamy 
 Ray Milland as Dashwood 
 Edwin Lawrence as Quartermaster 
 Eliot Makeham as Pvt. Slee 
 Hay Plumb as Pvt. Goffin 
 Wally Patch as Regimental Sergeant Major 
 Jane Cornell as Starlet 
 Glennis Lorimer as Marigold 
 Sydney Keith as Rosenblatt

Critical reception
In The New York Times, Mordaunt Hall called the film, "a tepid farce...It is an adaptation of a minor stage work written by Ian Hay and Anthony Armstrong, and the wonder is that the producers, Gaumont-British, thought it worthy of such an excellent company of players. On the credit side of this piece of buffoonery and punning there are the interesting glimpses in a military barracks, splendid photography and sound recording and good-natured work by the cast."

References

External links

1933 films
1933 comedy films
British comedy films
Films based on works by Ian Hay
Films directed by Walter Forde
Films set in England
British black-and-white films
Gainsborough Pictures films
Films shot at Lime Grove Studios
1930s English-language films
1930s British films